Hypericum somaliense is a species of flowering plant of the St. John's wort family (Hypericaceae) that is found in Somalia.

Taxonomy 

The placement of H. somaliense within Hypericum can be summarized as follows:

Hypericum
 Hypericum subg. Hypericum
 Hypericum sect. Adenosepalum
 subsect. Adenosepalum
 subsect. Aethiopica
 Huber-Morathii group
 subsect. Caprifolia
 H. caprifolium
 H. coadunatum
 H. collenetteae
 H. naudinianum
 H. psilophytum
 H. pubescens
 H. scruglii
 H. sinaicum
 H. somaliense
 H. tomentosum

References 

somaliense